Sinopesa is a genus of spiders in the family Nemesiidae. It is found in China and on Ryukyu Islands in Japan. It was first described in 1995 by Raven & Schwendinger. , it contains 8 Asian species.

Species
Sinopesa comprises the following species:
Sinopesa chengbuensis (Xu & Yin, 2002) — China
Sinopesa chinensis (Kulczyński, 1901) — China
Sinopesa gollum Lin & Li, 2021 — China
Sinopesa guansheng Lin & Li, 2023 — China
Sinopesa kumensis Shimojana & Haupt, 2000 — Japan (Ryukyu Is.)
Sinopesa maculata Raven & Schwendinger, 1995 — Thailand
Sinopesa ninhbinhensis Li & Zonstein, 2015 — Vietnam
Sinopesa sinensis (Zhu & Mao, 1983) — China

References

Nemesiidae
Mygalomorphae genera
Spiders of Asia